Shuangfeng Subdistrict is a subdistrict situated within Shunyi District, Beijing, China. it is located at the south of Niulanshan Town, west of Beixiaoying and Nancai Towns, north of Guangming, Shengli and Wangquan Subdistricts, and east of Nanfaxin and Mapo Towns. The result of the 2020 Chinese Census determined the subdistrict's population to be 68,176.

The subdistrict was created in 2007 from parts of the surrounding towns and areas.

Administrative divisions 

In 2021, Shuangfeng Subdistrict was composed of 32 subdivisions, where 17 were communities and 15 were villages:

Landmark 

 Shunyi Olympic Rowing-Canoeing Park

See also 

 List of township-level divisions of Beijing

References 

Shunyi District
Subdistricts of Beijing